North Carolina Highway 208 (NC 208) is a primary state highway in the U.S. state of North Carolina.  The highway serves as the most direct route between Asheville and Greeneville, Tennessee, through the Bald Mountains.

Route description
NC 208 is a  two-lane mountain highway that begins in the community of Hurricane and goes north hugging the banks of Big Laural Creek and (after a curved bridge) Shelton Laural Creek.  Once at Belva, the highway goes northwest towards Greeneville, Tennessee, passing through the community of Allenstand, before reaching the state line at Allen Gap (highest point on route).  Just beyond the state line, the Appalachian Trail crosses the highway. The entire highway is within the confines of the Pisgah National Forest.

History
Established in 1921 as an original state highway and has not changed since.

Junction list

References

External links

 
 NCRoads.com: N.C. 208

208
Transportation in Madison County, North Carolina